Larry David Sharpe (born July 12, 1968) is an American business consultant, entrepreneur, political activist, and podcaster. He was a candidate for the Libertarian Party nomination for vice-president of the United States in 2016, losing to former Massachusetts governor Bill Weld. Sharpe was the Libertarian nominee for Governor of New York in the 2018 gubernatorial election. He again received that party's gubernatorial nomination for the 2022 New York gubernatorial election, but did not meet the qualifications to be listed on the general election ballot and consequently ran as a write-in candidate.

Early life and career
Sharpe was born on July 12, 1968, in Manhattan, New York, and was adopted as an infant. He joined the United States Marines Corps at age 17, serving from 1986 to 1993. He received a Bachelor's Degree in Anthropology from the University of Maryland University College. After working as an English teacher, Sharpe founded Prime Distribution Inc., a trucking and distribution company which he later sold, in 2001. In 2004, Sharpe built an online business training company called Neo-Sage Group, Inc., for which he serves as managing director.

Political career
As a Libertarian Party activist, Sharpe has outlined a vision to grow the party by encouraging grassroots Libertarian Party campaigns across the country. Sharpe served on the Libertarian National Committee as the Alternate for Region 8, until his resignation in February 2018 because of an internal LNC vote that failed to oust the party's then-vice chair, Arvin Vohra, following public controversial comments made by Vohra.

2016 vice presidential campaign

Sharpe was a candidate for the 2016 Libertarian vice presidential nomination. During the 2016 Libertarian National Convention, he placed second on the first ballot with 30.4% of the vote. Because no one received a majority on that ballot, a second ballot vote was held. Sharpe received 46.9% of the vote on the second ballot, finishing second to former Massachusetts governor Bill Weld.

2018 New York gubernatorial campaign

On July 12, 2017, Sharpe announced his 2018 candidacy for Governor of New York, making him the first person to formally mount a challenge to incumbent Governor Andrew Cuomo in that election race. Sharpe received the Libertarian nomination on April 21, 2018, and Andrew Hollister was selected as the Lieutenant Governor nominee for the ticket.

Sharpe's campaign raised $102,596 prior to the first filing deadline, which was second to Andrew Cuomo's re-election campaign. As of October 10, 2018, Sharpe had raised $449,515 for his campaign, the highest amount ever raised by a Libertarian gubernatorial candidate in New York. Sharpe in addition was the only candidate in the race to have visited all 62 counties on the campaign trail.

On Election Day, Sharpe received 95,033 votes (1.6%) and came in fourth place behind Cuomo, Republican challenger Marc Molinaro, and Green Party candidate Howie Hawkins. Sharpe's vote total achieved automatic ballot access for the Libertarian Party of New York for the first time in the party's history.

Post-campaign activities
Following the 2018 election, Sharpe continued speaking tours across New York State. Since 2019, he has hosted the podcast The Sharpe Way.

2020 vice-presidential campaign
On April 13, 2020, it was announced that Sharpe would again seek the Libertarian Party's nomination for Vice President, as the running mate of 2012 Libertarian vice-presidential nominee Judge Jim Gray. After Gray was eliminated during convention presidential balloting, Sharpe withdrew from the race.

2022 New York gubernatorial campaign

On October 5, 2021, it was reported that Sharpe announced the formation of an exploratory committee to run for Governor of New York in the 2022 election.

On February 16, 2022, Sharpe officially announced his campaign to run for Governor of New York on Kennedy. During the announcement, he stated that he was seeking three lines: Libertarian Party, Forward Party, and Unite Party. Subsequently, the Forward Party endorsed Sharpe following his announcement.

Sharpe received the Libertarian gubernatorial nomination on February 19, 2022. Andrew Hollister, Sharpe's running mate in 2018, was again selected as the Lieutenant Governor nominee.

In July 2022, the New York State Board of Elections disqualified Sharpe from the election ballot for not meeting the qualifications for ballot access. Sharpe subsequently continued his gubernatorial campaign as a write-in candidate.

Political positions
Sharpe supports reducing regulations such as occupational licensing as well as legalizing marijuana and decriminalizing other drugs. Sharpe has advocated for raising revenue for New York by selling naming rights to bridges and highways.

Abortion
Sharpe considers himself "pro-choice" as well as "anti-abortion". While running for Governor, he vowed to reduce the number of abortions in New York state by increasing availability of other options instead of establishing regulations on abortion.

Criminal justice and drugs
Sharpe favors marijuana legalization, calling for hemp and marijuana to be "regulated like onions". Sharpe has said he would pardon those convicted of victimless crimes or otherwise non-violent offenses.

Economy
Sharpe has supported deregulation to stimulate economic growth, ending the funding of enforcement of unnecessary regulations. In particular, Sharpe has cited occupational licensing as a hurdle to small business, describing mandatory licensing for jobs such as barbers and dog walkers as "barriers to entry and a tax on the poor." Additionally, to reduce the state deficit, Sharpe has called for eliminating unfunded mandates. He has vowed to follow this reduction in state spending with a reduction in property taxes and the ultimate repeal of the New York state income tax.

Education
Sharpe has called for the decentralization of education in New York State and has proposed a "K-10" model, reducing the span of high school to ready students for the workforce and/or college. Sharpe has also rejected standardized testing until high school. He stated, "everyone should be able to opt out of testing at any time....it puts kids who have special needs at a huge disadvantage. Kids who do not test well are labeled as dumb."

Additionally, Sharpe stated he would refuse federal grants for education. He would also abolish the Board of Regents.

Gun laws
In his 2018 gubernatorial bid Sharpe vowed, if elected, to repeal the NY SAFE Act by 2020 and pardon those convicted under its provisions. Sharpe supports allowing school teachers and staff to carry firearms on school grounds, on a voluntary basis.

Personal life
Sharpe lives with his wife Georgia and their two children in Queens, New York.

Contributions

Electoral history

References

External links

 Larry Sharpe for Governor
 

1968 births
Living people
20th-century African-American people
21st-century African-American politicians
21st-century American businesspeople
21st-century American educators
21st-century American politicians
2016 United States vice-presidential candidates
2020 United States vice-presidential candidates
African-American company founders
American company founders
African-American educators
African-American United States Navy personnel
African-American people in New York (state) politics
American adoptees
American cannabis activists
American gun rights activists
American podcasters
Businesspeople from New York City
Candidates in the 2018 United States elections
Candidates in the 2022 United States elections
Educators from New York City
New York (state) Libertarians
Non-interventionism
Politicians from the Bronx
United States Marine Corps non-commissioned officers
University of Maryland Global Campus alumni